Amédéé Biner is a former Swiss curler. He played  skip position on the Swiss rink that won .

Teams

Private life
Biner is a baker, and is the former president of the Swiss Bakers Confectioners Association. He is former owner of a bakery company in Zermatt named "Bäckerei-Konditorei Biner" and founded in 1932 by his father Alfons Biner, who was a competitive curler too, and is a four-time Swiss men's curling champion.

In 1994 he offered the "Praliné Cup" for the open air curling tournament "Scottish Week Curling in Zermatt". Today, the awards for this final competition are indeed the finest Swiss chocolates supplied by the Biner bakery company. The January 2018 competition marked the 25th anniversary of the Praliné Cup.

References

External links
 

Living people

Swiss male curlers
European curling champions
Swiss curling champions
Bakers
Year of birth missing (living people)